Jons und Erdme is a 1959 West German drama film directed by Victor Vicas, starring Giulietta Masina and Carl Raddatz. It is based on the story "Jons and Erdma" from Hermann Sudermann's 1917 short story collection The Excursion to Tilsit.

Cast

References

External links 
 

1959 films
Films based on works by Hermann Sudermann
Films based on short fiction
German drama films
1950s German-language films
West German films
Films set in Lithuania
Films set in Prussia
Films about domestic violence
1950s German films